
Gmina Brójce is a rural gmina (administrative district) in Łódź East County, Łódź Voivodeship, in central Poland.

Villages
Gmina Brójce contains the villages and settlements of Brójce, Budy Wandalińskie, Bukowiec, Giemzów, Giemzówek, Karpin, Kotliny, Kurowice, Leśne Odpadki, Pałczew, Posada, Przypusta, Stefanów, Wardzyn, Wola Rakowa and Wygoda.

Neighbouring gminas
Gmina Brójce is bordered by the city of Łódź and by the gminas of Andrespol, Będków, Czarnocin, Koluszki, Rokiciny, Rzgów and Tuszyn.

References
Polish official population figures 2006

Brojce
Łódź East County